Execution in computer and software engineering is the process by which a computer or virtual machine reads and acts on the instructions of a computer program. Each instruction of a program is a description of a particular action which must be carried out, in order for a specific problem to be solved. Execution involves repeatedly following a 'fetch–decode–execute' cycle for each instruction done by control unit. As the executing machine follows the instructions, specific effects are produced in accordance with the semantics of those instructions. 

Programs for a computer may be executed in a batch process without human interaction or a user may type commands in an interactive session of an interpreter. In this case, the "commands" are simply program instructions, whose execution is chained together. 

The term run is used almost synonymously. A related meaning of both "to run" and "to execute" refers to the specific action of a user starting (or launching or invoking) a program, as in "Please run the application."

Process 

Prior to execution, a program must first be written. This is generally done in source code, which is then compiled at compile time (and statically linked at link time) to produce an executable. This executable is then invoked, most often by an operating system, which loads the program into memory (load time), possibly performs dynamic linking, and then begins execution by moving control to the entry point of the program; all these steps depend on the Application Binary Interface of the operating system. At this point execution begins and the program enters run time. The program then runs until it ends, either normal termination or a crash.

Executable 

Executable code, an executable file, or an executable program, sometimes simply referred to as an executable or 
binary, is a list of instructions and data to cause a computer "to perform indicated tasks according to encoded instructions", as opposed to a data file that must be interpreted (parsed) by a program to be meaningful. 

The exact interpretation depends upon the use. "Instructions" is traditionally taken to mean machine code instructions for a physical CPU. In some contexts, a file containing scripting instructions (such as bytecode) may also be considered executable.

Context of execution 
The context in which execution takes place is crucial. Very few programs execute on a bare machine. Programs usually contain implicit and explicit assumptions about resources available at the time of execution. Most programs execute within multitasking operating system and run-time libraries specific to the source language that provide crucial services not supplied directly by the computer itself. This supportive environment, for instance, usually decouples a program from direct manipulation of the computer peripherals, providing more general, abstract services instead.

Context switching 

In order for programs and interrupt handlers to work without interference and share the same hardware memory and access to the I/O system, in a multitasking operating systems running on a digital system with a single CPU/MCU it is required to have some sort of software and hardware facilities to keep track of an executing processes data (memory page addresses, registers etc.) and to save and recover them back to the state they were in before they were suspended. This is achieved by a context switching. The running programs are often assigned a Process Context IDentifiers (PCID).

In Linux-based operating systems, a set of data stored in registers is usually saved into a process descriptor in memory to implement switching of context. PCIDs are also used.

Runtime system 

A runtime system, also called runtime environment, primarily implements portions of an execution model.  This is not to be confused with the runtime lifecycle phase of a program, during which the runtime system is in operation. When treating the runtime system as distinct from the runtime environment (RTE), the first may be defined as a specific part of the application software (IDE) used for programming, a piece of software that provides the programmer a more convenient environment for running programs during their production (testing and similar), while the second (RTE) would be the very instance of an execution model being applied to the developed program which is itself then run in the aforementioned runtime system.

Most programming languages have some form of runtime system that provides an environment in which programs run. This environment may address a number of issues including the management of application memory, how the program accesses variables, mechanisms for passing parameters between procedures, interfacing with the operating system, and otherwise. The compiler makes assumptions depending on the specific runtime system to generate correct code. Typically the runtime system will have some responsibility for setting up and managing the stack and heap, and may include features such as garbage collection, threads or other dynamic features built into the language.

Instruction cycle

The instruction cycle (also known as the fetch–decode–execute cycle, or simply the fetch-execute cycle) is the cycle that the central processing unit (CPU) follows from boot-up until the computer has shut down in order to process instructions. It is composed of three main stages: the fetch stage, the decode stage, and the execute stage. 

In simpler CPUs, the instruction cycle is executed sequentially, each instruction being processed before the next one is started. In most modern CPUs, the instruction cycles are instead executed concurrently, and often in parallel, through an instruction pipeline: the next instruction starts being processed before the previous instruction has finished, which is possible because the cycle is broken up into separate steps.

Interpreter 

A system that executes a program is called an interpreter of the program. Loosely speaking, an interpreter directly executes a program. This contrasts with a language translator that converts a program from one language to another before it is executed.

Virtual machine 

A virtual machine (VM) is the virtualization/emulation of a computer system.  Virtual machines are based on computer architectures and provide functionality of a physical computer. Their implementations may involve specialized hardware, software, or a combination.

Virtual machines differ and are organized by their function, shown here:

 System virtual machines (also termed full virtualization VMs) provide a substitute for a real machine. They provide functionality needed to execute entire operating systems. A hypervisor uses native execution to share and manage hardware, allowing for multiple environments which are isolated from one another, yet exist on the same physical machine. Modern hypervisors use hardware-assisted virtualization, virtualization-specific hardware, primarily from the host CPUs.
 Process virtual machines are designed to execute computer programs in a platform-independent environment.

Some virtual machine emulators, such as QEMU and video game console emulators, are designed to also emulate (or "virtually imitate") different system architectures thus allowing execution of software applications and operating systems written for another CPU or architecture. OS-level virtualization allows the resources of a computer to be partitioned via the kernel. The terms are not universally interchangeable.

References

See also 
 Executable
 Run-time system
 Runtime program phase
 Program counter

Computing terminology